Because of the nature of onomatopoeia, there are many words which show a similar pronunciation in the languages of the world. The following is a list of some conventional examples:

Human sounds

Consuming food or drink

Bodily functions and involuntary sounds

Cries of distress

Interrupted speech

Expressions of positive emotions

Animal sounds

Bird sounds

Domestic birds

Wild birds

Mammal sounds

Cats and dogs

Equine sounds

Animals with cloven hoofs

Other mammals

Other animals

Collisions, bursts, and strikes

Balloon or bubble bursting
In Albanian, pau, puf
In Arabic, pakh, poof
In batak. tak
In Bemba, pobo 
In Bengali, phat, phatash 
In Bulgarian, puc пук, pa па
In Croatian, puk
In Czech, puf
In Danish, bang, knald
In Dutch, pang, pof, paf, poef
In English, pop, bang
In Estonian pops
In Finnish, poks
In French, bang, pop
In German, baeng, plop
In Greek, bam μπαμ, bum μπουμ
In Hindi, thaa, phatt
In Hungarian, pukk (quieter); durr, bumm, bámm (louder)
In Indonesian, dor
In Italian, bum
In Japanese, pan 
In Korean, ppang 빵, ppeong 뻥, pang 팡, peong 펑
In Latvian, bliukš
In Lithuanian, pokšt
In Macedonian, pau пау
In Marathi, Dhum ढुम्
In Navajo, dǫǫn (nasalized o)
In Persian, poloq
In Polish, bum, pyk
In Portuguese, pá, bum
In Romanian, poc
In Russian, bakh бах
In Serbian, puk
In Slovene, pok
In Spanish, pop
In Swedish, poff
In Tagalog, putók, pak
In Thai,  (po),  (pang)  
In Turkish, bom
In Vietnamese, bốp, bụp

Cannon firing; gunshot; machine gun fire
In Afrikaans, kaboem; boem; ra-tat-tat
In Albanian, pum-pum; bau-bau, ta-ta-ta-ta, du-du-du-du
In Arabic, bom; bov, tokh طخ
In Basque, bunba; danba; ta-ta-ta-ta-ta
In Bengali, goom goom
In Bulgarian, bum бум, kh кх,  тататата
In Catalan, buuum, pumba; pam, pum; ratatatatà
In Chinese, Mandarin, pēng 砰; ping, pa 乒, 啪; da da da... 嗒嗒嗒 
In Croatian, bum, pam, puf, ratatata
In Czech, bum, prásk, ratatata
In Danish, bang, bum
In Dutch, boem, biem; pang, pauw; ratatata, trrrr
In English, bam, boom, blam, kaboom; bang, pow; rat-at-at-at-at-at, gat-gat-gat-gat, skkrrt skkrrt, dakka-dakka
In Estonian, põmm, kõmm; pauh, karpauh
In Finnish, pum; pam; ra-ta-ta-ta-ta-ta, rä-tä-tä-tä-tä-tä
In French, boum; pan
In German, bumm, rumms, kawumm; peng, puff, päng; rat-tat-tat-tat
In Greek, cabum, bum μπουμ, bam μπαμ; bam, pan, piu-piu (mainly by children); trrrrrr
In Hebrew, bum בּוּם
In Hindi, thaa
In Hungarian bumm, dörr; ratata, trrrrr
In Icelandic, búmm; bamm
In Indonesian, dor,
In Italian, bum; bang; pum
In Japanese,  (bān bān), dōn , bakyūn 
In Kannada, dum, dhaam
In Kazakh, bydyrsch быдырщ
In Korean, ppang 빵, tang 탕
In Latvian, bum
In Lithuanian, bumpt, bum, pokšt
In Persian, bang 
In Macedonian, bum бум; pau пау; ra ta ta ta ра та та та
In Marathi, Dhishkyaon ढिश्क्यँव, dhishum धिशुम
In Polish, bum-bum; bang-bang, pif-paf and others; tra ta ta ta ta
In Portuguese, bam, boom, cabum; pá,pum; ratátátá
In Romanian, bum; poc
In Russian, ba-bakh ба-бах; pif-paf пиф-паф; tra-ta-ta тра-та-та
In Sinhalese, ḍisum ඩිසුම්; ḍung ඩුං; ḍaka-ḍaka-ḍaka ඩක-ඩක-ඩක
In Spanish, pum; bang; praca
In Swedish, bom; pang, bang
In Tagalog, boom; boogsh
In Tamil, dishum; dumeel
In Telugu, dishyoom
In Thai,  (tuum, cannon firing);  (pang, gunshot)
In Turkish, bom, bam, güm, dıkşınyaa (by kids)
In Uropi, bam (cannon), pang (gun)
In Vietnamese, đoàng (louder); pằng (quieter); bùm (usually for cannons)

Crash
In Albanian, pum, bau, përrtaf, 
In Afrikaans, doef, kadoef
In Arabic, bom, tàkh, tràkh
In Basque: danba, pun, plaust
In Bengali: ṭhash ঠাস, ṭhush ঠুস, dhum ধুম, dham ধাম, daram, dhapash
In Bulgarian, bum бум, dum дум, trjas тряс, pras прас
In Catalan, bumba, catacrac, patam, paf
In Chinese, Mandarin, hong 轰
In Croatian, bum, tres, krašš
In Czech, řach, bum, prásk
In Danish, bum, bump, bang, krasj
In Dutch, boem, knal, plof, bam
In English, boom, bam, wham, slam, bang, crash, clash, pow, thonk, thunk, thud, clang
In Estonian, prõmm, pauh, piraki, karpauh
In Tagalog, ka-boom
In Finnish, pam, pum, ryskis, kolin, räiskis
In French, bing, bang, boum, bam, vlan
In German, rumms, bumms, bauz, krach, knall
In Gilbertese, beeku
In Greek, bam μπαμ, gcup
In Haitian Creole, bip
In Hebrew, bum בּוּם, trax טְרַאח
In Hindi, dhishumm धिशुम्म, dhishum धिशुम
In Hungarian, dzzs, bumm, bamm, puff, paff, csatt, nyekk
In Indonesian, buk, brekk, j'derr
In Italian, bum, badabeu, patatraf
In Japanese,  (gān)
In Korean, kung 쿵
In Kyrgyz, тарс
In Latin, tuxtax
In Latvian, bum
In Lithuanian, bumpt, bum
In Macedonian, bum бум, pam пам, pum пум, dum дум, très трес
In Malay, gedebak-gedebuk, beng
In Marathi, dhadaam धडाम्
In Polish, bum, trach
In Portuguese, crash, boom
In Romanian, bum, buf, pac, poc, trosc, zbang
In Russian, bum бум
In Sinhalese, daḍas දඩස්
In Spanish, bum, catapum, crash
In Swedish, krasch
In Tamil, dhishumm, dhishum
In Thai,  (khrom)
In Turkish, güm, bam, dıkş, çat, pat, zbam
In Vietnamese, ầm, rầm

Door or floor creaking
In Albanian, grr
In Afrikaans, kraak
In Bulgarian, skratz скръц
In Arabic, azeeez أزيـــز
In Catalan, nyieec, nyeeec
In Croatian, škrip
In Czech, vrrzzz, skřííííp
In Danish, knirk
In Dutch, kraak
In English, creak
In Estonian, kriiks, kriuks
In Finnish, kriik, narsk
In French, crac
In German, knarz
In Hindi, charrr
In Hungarian, nyííí
In Indonesian, krieeet
In Italian, criiic, craaac
In Japanese, gī 
In Kazakh, shiiq шииқ
In Korean, ppi-geok 삐걱
In Kyrgyz, кыйч
In Latvian, čīk
In Malay, eeek (keriang-keriut)
In Polish, skrzyp
In Persian, γež-γež غژ غژ
In Romanian, scârț
In Russian, skreep скрип
In Spanish, ñyeec, ñyiic
In Swedish, knarr
In Tagalog, ekk
In Thai,  (aet)
In Turkish, gıcır, gıcırt
In Uropi, krak
In Vietnamese, kétttt, ken két, cọt kẹt, kẽo kẹt

Engine back-firing while freewheeling
In Albanian, përr-përr-përr, dum-dum-dum
In Batak, put-put-put, doput-doput
In Italian, rrra-tatatatata...
In Malay, prreng prreng
In Polish, pyr pyr pyr
In Romanian, pâr pâr
In Russian, dìr-dìr-dìr дыр-дыр-дыр
In Spanish, tac tac tac

Knocking
In Albanian, tak-tak, tok-tok, trok-trok
In Arabic, daqqa دَقَّ
In Afrikaans, klop
In Batak, tok-tok-tok
In Bengali, khat khat, takatak, thok thok
In Bosnian, kuc kuc
In Bulgarian, chuc chuc чук чук
In Catalan, toc toc
In Chinese, Mandarin, dang dang dang 当当当
In Croatian, kuc kuc
In Czech, ťuk ťuk
In Danish, bank bank
In Dutch, klop klop
In English, knock knock, bang bang bang
In Finnish, kop kop
In Estonian, kopp kopp
In French, toc toc
In German, klopf klopf
In Greek, τοκ τοκ
In Hebrew, tuq tuq תּוּק־תּוּק
In Hindi, thakk thakk
In Hungarian, kop kop, kip kop
In Icelandic, bank bank
In Indonesian, tok tok
In Italian, toc toc
In Japanese,  (kotsu kotsu), kon kon , ton ton 
In Korean, ttok ttok 똑똑
In Latvian, tuk tuk
In Lithuanian, tuk tuk
In Malay, tok tok tok (ketuk)
In Marathi, thak-thak ठक्-ठक्
In Persian, taq-taq
In Polish, puk-puk
In Portuguese, toc toc, noque noque, truz truz
In Romanian, cioc-cioc
In Russian, tuk-tuk тук-тук
In Spanish, toc toc
In Swedish, knack knack
In Tagalog, tok tok tok
In Thai,  (kok kok kok)
In Turkish, tak tak
In Vietnamese, cốc cốc, cộc cộc
In Zulu, nqo nqo nqo

Strikes

Dull strike
In Albanian, pum, bam, llau
In Afrikaans, doef
In Bulgarian, toup туп, khlop хлоп
In Croatian, tup
In Danish, bump, dunk
In English, knock, bump, rap, thud, boom, thump
In Finnish, tök, pöksis
In German, klopf, plumps, platsch
In Japanese, don , zun 
In Korean, peok 퍽
In Persian, bāmp
In Polish, łup
In Portuguese, puf, pluft, pum
In Russian, bats бац
In Romanian, buf!
In Spanish, toc
In Swedish, dunk, duns
In Thai,  (tueng),  (tueng)
In Turkish, pof, pot

Falling strike
In Albanian, pum, pëlltaf, përrtaf
In Afrikaans, plof
In Bulgarian, plyos пльос, shlyap шляп
In Croatian, pljas, tres, bum, tup
In Czech, žuch
In Dutch, plof, plop
In English, plop, splat, thud, thunk, thonk
In French, floc
In German, plumps, patsch, plump
In Hungarian, puff, paff
In Indonesian, bruk, gedebuk
In Japanese, potori 
In Korean, teok 턱
In Persian, dāmb
in Polish: dup, łubudu (longer, louder)
In Portuguese, ploft, paft, catapluft, pimba
In Romanian, pleosc, fleoșc
In Russian, khlop хлоп shlyop шлёп
In Spanish, plaf, paf
In Tagalog. blag, bug
In Thai,  (khrohm)
In Turkish, pat
In Vietnamese, bịch

Sharp strike
In Albanian, tink, ting
In Afrikaans, klingel, kletter  
In Bulgarian, dzun дзън
In Catalan, cling, clang, cataclinc-cataclanc
In Czech, cink
In Croatian, zvek, zvec
In Chinese, Cantonese, bìhng-līng baang-làahng 乒鈴嘭唥
In Chinese, Mandarin, kuāng lāng 哐啷, guang-dang 哐当
In Dutch, klink, ring, klingel, rinkel, kletter, tingel
In English, clang, clink, clank, clunk, chink, dink, tink, plink, ding, ring, ping, ting, jingle, jangle, tinkle, pow, conk
In Finnish, kilin, kolin
In French, paf, bim, bam
In German, klang, kling, klirr, klimper, klingel, bimmel
In Hebrew, zbang זְבֶּנְג
In Indonesian, jleb
In Japanese,  (kān)
In Korean, jjaeng 쨍, ting 팅
In Persian, jiring
In Portuguese, pim, plim
In Romanian, jap, harsht, trosc
In Russian, dzyn’ дзынь, zvyak звяк, klatz клац
In Spanish, tintin, tilín
In Thai,  (ting),  (ping)
In Turkish, çang, çing
In Vietnamese, keng, beng

Wet strike
In Afrikaans, plons, plas, spat 
In Albanian, plluq, pëlltuq, pllaf
In Arabic, بلوف 
In Bulgarian, plyok пльок
In Catalan, xap, xof, patatxap
In Croatian, šljap
In Czech, plesk
In Chinese, Mandarin, ba-ji 啪唧
In Danish, plask
In Dutch, plons
In English, splash, splish, splosh, splat
In Estonian lärts, plärts
In Finnish, loiskis, mäts
In French, plouf
In German, patsch, platsch, klatsch, schwapp
In Hungarian, platty, placcs
In Indonesian, crot, byur
In Italian, plop 
In Japanese, bicha 
In Korean, cheolpudeok 철푸덕, cheolpeok 철퍽
In Kyrgyz, чалп
In Malay, trushh, shushh, pishh
In Persian, čolop-čolop, pešenge
In Polish, plask
In Portuguese, tchibum
In Romanian, pleosc, fleoșc, fleașc
In Russian, bultykh бултых, plyukh плюх
In Spanish, splash, plaf
In Swedish, plask
In Tagalog, plok
In Thai,  (plo),  (plae)
In Tamil, chatak
In Turkish, şap, şop
In Uropi, plac
In Vietnamese, bẹp, phọp

Crunch, сracking (of sticks, bones etc.) 
In Croatian, krc 
In Czech, křup
In English crunch, crash, crack
In Hindi, kadhak
In Russian, khryas хрясь, khrust хрусть
In Turkish, çatır
In Vietnamese, rắc

Machinery

Camera shutter
In Albanian, klik
In Afrikaans, klik
In Arabic, chic chic تشك تشك
In Basque, klisk
In Batak, ceklek
In Bulgarian, щрак (shtrak)
In Catalan, cx, xic, txc or txic
In Chinese, Mandarin, kā chā咔嚓
In Croatian, klik
In Czech, cvak
In Danish, klik
In Dutch, klik
In English, click
In Estonian klõps, plõks
In Finnish, klik
In French, clic
In German, klick
In Hebrew, chik צִ'יק
In Hungarian, klikk
In Italian, clic
In Indonesian, cepret, cekrek
In Japanese, pasha パシャ
In Korean, chalkak 찰칵
In Kyrgyz, чырк
In Latvian, klik klik
In Malay, cekek cekek
In Nepali,  खिचिक्क
In Polish, pstryk, klik klik
In Portuguese, clic clic
In Romanian, clic
In Russian, shchyolk щёлк, chik чик
In Spanish, clic
In Swedish, klick
In Tagalog, klik
In Thai,  (chae)
In Turkish, klik, şlak
In Uropi, klik
In Vietnamese, lách cách

Car engine revving
In Albanian, vum-vum-vum, përr-përr-përr
In Afrikaans, wroem,  broem
In Arabic, hunn hunn هن هــن, aan aan آن آن
In Batak, ngong, ngooongngng
In Bulgarian, bram-bram бръм-бръм
In Catalan, rum, rumm
In Croatian, brum brum, vrum vrum
In Czech, brmmm brmmm
In Danish, vrum vrum, brum brum, nøn nøn
In Dutch, broem, vroem
In English, vroom vroom, broom broom
In Estonian, põrr põrr
In Finnish, vruum vruum, bruum bruum, prööm prööm (spoken)
In French, vroum vroum
In German, brumm brumm, wrumm wrumm
In Hebrew,  aan aan אָאן אָאן
In Hungarian, brum brumm
In Indonesian, bremmm bremmm, ngeng ngeng
In Italian, brum brum, vrum vrum
In Japanese, buroro 
In Korean, bureung bureung 부릉부릉
In Malay, ngeng ngeng, brum brum, vrum vrum, preng preng, ngii ngii
In Polish, brummm brummmm
In Portuguese, vruum vruum
In Romanian, vrum vrum
In Russian, rrr ppp ru ru ру ру rum rum рум рум
In Spanish, rue fun
In Swedish, brum
In Telugu, raeyyyyyyy
In Thai,  (bruen bruen)
In Turkish, vrum vrum (truck), vrın vrın (car)
In Vietnamese, bờ rừm

Car horn honking
In Albanian, po-po, ty-ty
In Afrikaans, toet
In Arabic, beeb beep, طيط-طيط ṭiṭ-ṭiṭ
In Batak, tot, tooot
In Bulgarian, bi-biip би-биип
In Catalan, pipip, mec mec, moc moc
In Chinese, Mandarin, di di 嘀嘀 or 滴滴
In Croatian, tu tu, bi bip
In Czech, tů tů
In Danish, dyt dyt, båt båt
In Dutch, toet toet
In English, honk honk, beep beep, toot toot
In Estonian, tuut tuut, piip piip
In Finnish, tööt tööt
In French, tut-tut
In German, tut
In Greek,  bip bip, μπιπ μπιπ
In Hebrew,  bip bip בִּיפּ־בִּיפּ
In Hungarian, tü-tű, tü-tűt
In Icelandic. bíb bíb
In Indonesian, din din
In Italian, bip bip, biii biii
In Japanese, pu pū 
In Korean, ppang ppang 빵빵
In Latvian, pī pī
In Lithuanian, pyp pyp
In Malay, pon pon, pot pot, ,pet pet, pin pin (toy car)
In Marathi, paa-paa पँ-पँ
In Norwegian, bært bært
In Polish, bib-biiib
In Portuguese, bi-bi or fon-fon
In Romanian, tiiit!  ti-ti!
In Russian, bi-bi би-би, bi-bip би-бип
In Spanish, pi pi, pip pip
In Swedish, tut tut
In Tagalog, bip bip
In Telugu, poy ppoy
In Thai,  (pin pin)
In Turkish, düt düt, bip bip, dat dat
In Uropi, tut
In Vietnamese, bim bim, pim pim

Clock ticking

In Albanian, tik-tak
In Afrikaans, tik-tok
In Basque, tiki-taka
In Batak, tik-tak, tik-tak
In Bengali, tik tik
In Bulgarian, tic tac тик так
In Catalan, tic-tac
In Chinese, Mandarin, dī dā 嘀嗒
In Croatian, tik tak
In Czech, tik ťak
In Danish, tik tak
In Dutch, tik tak
In English, tick tock
In Estonian, tikk takk
In Finnish, tik tak
In French, tic tac
In German, tick tack
In Greek, tic tac τικ τακ
In Hebrew, tiq taq תִּיק־תַּק
In Hindi, tic tic
In Hungarian, tik tak
In Icelandic, tik tak
In Indonesian, tik tok
In Italian, tic toc, tic tac
In Japanese,  (chikutaku),  (kachi kachi)
In Korean ttok-ttak ttok-ttak 똑딱똑딱
In Latvian, tik tak
In Lithuanian, tik tak
In Macedonian, tic tac тик так
In Malay, tik tok
In Marathi, tik-tik टिक-टिक
In Nepali, clit caqq
In Norwegian tikk takk
In Polish, tik tak
In Portuguese, tique-taque, tic toc
In Romanian, tic tac
In Russian, tic-tac тик-так
In Slovene, tik tak
In Spanish, tic tac
In Swedish, tick tack
In Tagalog, tik tak tik tak
In Tamil, tik tik
In Thai,  (tiktok)
In Turkish, tik tak
In Vietnamese, tích tắc
In Volapük, tiktö

Doorbell ringing
 In Albanian, tring-tring, ding-dong
 In Afrikaans, trieng
 In Basque, dilin-dalan
 In Catalan, ding-dong, ring-ring, meec...
 In Croatian, din don
 In Danish, ding ding, ring ring
 In Dutch, tring tring
 In English, ding-dong, bing-bong
 In Finnish, pim pom
 In French, ding-dong
 In German, klingeling
 In Hungarian, csing-ling
 In Indonesian, ting-tong
 In Italian, din don, drin drin
 In Japanese, ピンポーン (pinpōn)
 In Malay, ding dong, ting tong
 In Marathi, ting-tong टिंग-टौंग
 In Polish, dzyń-dzyń
 In Portuguese, ding dong
 In Romanian, țâr țâr
 In Russian, din-don дин-дон
 In Spanish, ding dong
 In Swedish, ding dong, pling plong
In Turkish, zır, ding, ding dong
 In Tagalog, ding dong
 In Thai,  (ting tong),  (ting nong),
 In Italian, din don

Keyboard striking
In Albanian, tok-tok-tok, tëk-tëk-tëk
In Batak, tik tik
In Bulgarian,  
In Catalan , 
In Czech, klik, ťuk ťuk
In Danish: klik klik
In Dutch: tik tik
In English: click click, click clack
In Estonian klõp klõp klõp
In Finnish: klik klik, klik klak, naks, naputinap
In French: clic clic
In German: klack klack klack (typewriter), tipp tipp tipp (computer)
In Hebrew, 
In Italian, clic clic, tip tap
In Japanese, kata kata 
In Latvian, klikš, klab klab
In Malay, tek tek tek tek
In Polish, klik klik
In Russian, klatz-klatz клац-клац
In Spanish, tac tac tac
In Swedish, knapp knapp, klick klick
In Tagalog, chu ku chu ku chuk
In Thai,  (kokkaek)
In Turkish, tıkı tıkı tıkı, tıkır tıkır
In Vietnamese, lạch cạch

Match striking
In Albanian, frrap
In Bengali, phash
In Russian, chirk чирк
In English, fwoosh

Telephone ringing
In Albanian, 
In Afrikaans, 
In Arabic,  
In Basque, 
In Batak, 
In Bengali, 
In Bulgarian,  
In Catalan, 
In Chinese, Mandarin, 
In Croatian, 
In Czech, 
In Danish, 
In Dutch, 
In English, ring ring, brrring brrring, ringaling
In Estonian 
In Finnish, 
In French, 
In German, 
In Hungarian, 
In Indonesian, 
In Italian, 
In Japanese, 
In Kazakh,  
In Korean,  
In Kyrgyz, 
In Latvian, 
In Lithuanian, 
In Malay,  (
In Polish, 
In Portuguese, 
In Romanian, 
In Russian,  
In Spanish, 
In Swedish, 
In Tagalog, 
In Thai,  
In Turkish, 
In Vietnamese,

Siren wailing
In Albanian, iu-iu-iu, auo-auo
In Afrikaans, pie-pô
In Arabic, wee-wee
In Bengali, pay puu
In Bosnian, ni-na ni-na ni-na, ninu ninu
In Bulgarian, tii-nu-nii-nu нии-ну-нии-ну
In Catalan, ninu ni, ni no ni no
In Croatian, ninu ninu, tinu ninu, viju viju, fiju fiju, tiru liru
In Danish, ba bu
In Dutch, Taatuutaatuu
In English Nee naw, wee-woo, waow-waow (police), awooga (klaxon),
In Estonian, Viiu, viiu,
In Filipino, wang wang wang
In Finnish, Pii paa, Viiuu viiuu viiuu
In French, Pin Pon
In German, Tatütata
In Greek, eeuu eeuu ηου-ηου
In Hungarian, nínó, nénó
In Indonesian,  ninu ninu 
In Italian, nino nino, ta tu-ta tu
In Japanese,  (pīpō pīpō)
In Korean, ppippo ppippo 삐뽀 삐뽀
In Latvian, ī-ū
In Macedonian, piu uiu пиу уиу
In Malay, nino nino, iyo iyo
In Minions, mi naw mi naw 
In Norwegian, Bæ bu bæ bu
In Polish, ioioioio
In Portuguese, uooooo /uóóóóó/, uiu uiu uiu, tinóni
In Romanian, ni no ni no
In Russian, wiu-wiu виу-виу or уиу-уиу
In Slovene, uiuiui
In Spanish Wiu Wiu, nino-nino
In Tamil, aaaaaeeen-neeeeen
In Thai,  (pipo pipo),  (wiwo wiwo)
In Turkish, Daa dii
In Vietnamese, ò e í e

Train whistling
In Albanian, ty-tyy
In Afrikaans, toe-toe
In Arabic, toot-toot
In Bengali, poo
In Bulgarian, ту-тууу (tu-tuuu) 
In Catalan, tu tu, tu tuut
In Chinese, Cantonese, 嗚嗚
In Croatian, ču ču
In Czech, hůůů
In Danish, fut fut
In Dutch, tuutuut
In English, choo choo, woo woo
In Estonian, tuut tuut
In Finnish, tuut tuut
In French, tchou tchou
In German, lah nah, spä nö
In Hebrew, tu-tu טוּ־טוּ
In Hindi, tree paa tee
In Hungarian, si-hu-hu-hu 
In Indonesian, tuuut tuuut
In Italian, tu tuu, ciuf ciuf
In Japanese, shuppo shuppo 
In Kazakh, чу-чуууу
In Korean, chik chik pok pok 칙칙폭폭
In Latvian, tū tū
In Lithuanian, tū tū
In Marathi, choo-choo चू-चूऽ
In Polish, tu-tuuu
In Portuguese, piuí 
In Romanian, u! uuu!
In Russian, tu-tuu ту-туу, tu-duu ту-дуу, roo nee pоу-ни
In Spanish, chu chu
In Swedish, tuut-tuut
In Tagalog, hup
In Telugu, koo chuk chuk
In Thai,  (pun pun)
In Turkish, düt düüt

Physical and natural phenomena

Electric flowing (buzzing)
In Albanian, 
In Afrikaans, 
In English, bzzz buzz
In Hebrew,  
In Japanese,  
In Korean,  
In Latvian, 
In Polish, 
In Romanian, 
In Spanish, 
In Swedish, 
In Thai,

Electric shock
In Albanian, zëp, xëp
In Catalan, pssst.
In Croatian, bzzzt
In English, zap
In Filipino, tssst
In Finnish, tsäp
In French, zap
In German, zapp
In Japanese, biri , bachi 
In Polish, bzzt
In Turkish, bızt

Fire
In Albanian, vu-vu-vu
In Afrikaans, knetter
In Basque, su-su
In Dutch, knetter
In English, crackle crackle
In German, knister knister
In Hungarian, rip-rop
In Japanese, Pachi pachi パチパチ
In Polish, trzask
In Swedish, knaster knaster
In Thai,  (prueb),  (prueb prub)

Rain
In English, pitter-patter
In French, plic ploc
In Hebrew, teef taf
In Hungarian, csipp csepp
In Japanese, shito shito しとしと
In Mandarin, xī lì huālā 淅瀝哗啦
In Russian, kap-kap кап-кап
In Turkish, şakır şakır

Thunder
In Albanian, bau, pëtau, përtau
In Basque, burrun
In Batak, huist
In English, crack, kaboom
In German, zack
In Hebrew,  b'raq
In Korean, beonjjeok 번쩍
In Marathi, kadaad कडाड
In Nepali,  गड्याङ-गुडुङ
In Portuguese, Kabum, buum, boom
In Spanish, brum
In Swedish, kabrak
In Thai,  (priang)

Steam hissing
In Afrikaans, sis
In Albanian, kshhh
In Arabic, fssss
In Batak, ssssss
In Croatian, pššššš
In English, psss
In German, zisch
In Hebrew, psss פְּססס
In Japanese, pushū 
In Romanian, fâs, fsssss
In Russian, psssh пшшш
In Spanish, psss
In Swedish, pssst
In Tagalog, sssss
In Thai,  (fuu)

Thunder
In Albanian, bubu, bubububum
In Batak, rapak, maturapak, dugu-dugu-dugu
In Bengali, kar kar, gur gur
In Catalan, brrum
In English, roll, rumble, boom
In Finnish, jyrin, jylin
In German, groll, grummel
In Hungarian, dörr
In Japanese, goro goro 
In Marathi, gad-gad गड्-गड्
In Polish, grzmot
In Romanian, bum
In Russian, babakh бабах, tararakh тарарах, trakh-tararakh трах-тарарах
In Swedish, muller
In Tagalog, boom
In Thai,  (kruen kruen)

Water dripping
In Albanian, pik-pik, pim-pim
In Afrikaans, drip
In Arabic, tik tik or tok tok
In Bengali: টুপ টুপ ṭup ṭup ঢিপ ঢিপ ḍhip ḍhip
In Bulgarian, cap-cap кап-кап
In Chinese, Cantonese, dihk-dihk 滴滴
In Chinese, Mandarin, dī dá 滴答
In Catalan, plip plip, tip-tip-tip
In Croatian, kap kap
In Czech, kap
In Danish, dryp dryp (dryppe is the verbal), plop plop
In Dutch, drup drup, drip, drop
In English, drip drop, plink plonk
In Estonian, tilks tilks
In Finnish, tip tip, plip plop
In French, plic plic/ploc
In German, plitsch, platsch, tropf
In Greek, plits plits πλιτς πλιτς, splats splats σπλατς σπλατς
In Hebrew, tif taf טִיף־טַף
In Hindi, tipak, tipak
In Hungarian, csöp-csöp, csip-csöp (csöpp or csepp is also the word for "drop")
In Indonesian, tik tik
In Italian, plin plin, plop plop
In Japanese,  (potsu potsu), pota pota 
In Korean, ttokttok 똑똑, ttuk-ttuk 뚝뚝
In Latvian, pik pik, pak pak, pakš pakš
In Lithuanian, krapt krapt, krap krap
In Macedonian, cap cap кап кап
In Marathi, tap-tap टप-टप
In Persian, ček ček, čak čak
In Polish, kap kap (kapać is the verb)
In Portuguese, plim plim, plic plic
In Romanian, pic pic
In Russian, kap kap кап-кап
In Spanish, ploc ploc, pluip pluip
In Swedish, dripp dropp
In Tagalog, tuk tuk tuk
In Tamil, sottu-sottu
In Telugu, tup tup
In Thai,  (ting ting),  (mae mae)
In Turkish, şıp şıp
In Uropi, plok
In Vietnamese, tỏng tỏng, toỏng toỏng, tí tách

White water
In Batak, soook

Wind blowing or waves flowing
In Albanian, kshh, fëshh
In Bengali, ভোঁ bhõ, শন শন shôn shôn, ঝির ঝির jhir jhir
In Basque, firu-firu
In Bulgarian, fiiuu фииуу
In Chinese, Mandarin, fuuu
In Croatian, fiju
In Czech, fíííí
In Dutch, woesh, woesj
In English, whoo, whoosh, swish, rustle, whine, whizz, whistle, wheeze, howl, zoom, sigh
In Finnish, viuuh
In French, frou-frou, vromb, murmur, hurl
In German, huiiih, wutsch, saus, rausch, wein, schwirr, heul, zoom, surr, seufz
In Greek, fru fru φρού φρού, sfýrigh σφύριγ, url ούρλ, sýrigh σύριγ, thýr θυρ
In Hindi, sarr sarr, saayein saayein
In Hungarian, hiss-huss, huss
In Italian, fiuu, fisch, mormor, url, sussurr
In Japanese, byuu byuu, pyuu pyuu, zawa zawa, soyo soyo
In Korean, wing-wing 윙윙
In Lithuanian, ššš
In Macedonian, fuuuu fuuuu фуууу фуууу
In Persian, moj, موج
In Polish, szszszsz, huuuuuu
In Portuguese, Vuuuush
In Romanian, vâj
In Russian, uu-u уу-у
In Spanish, fuuuu fuuuu, fgrrrr frgrrrr, aul, zumb, susurr
In Swedish, svisch
In Tagalog, fuuuu fuuuu
In Tamil, shhhhhhhhhh
In Telugu, shhhhhhh
In Thai,  (wio wio),  (fio fio)
In Turkish, vuuuu vuuuu
In Vietnamese, vi vu, vù vù; rì rào, xào xạc (rustling)

Others

Jingling
In Albanian, tring-tring, dring-dring
In Afrikaans, klingel, klingeling
In Arabic, خشخش (khashkhash)
In Armenian zar zank զար զանկ
In Basque, tilin-tilin, tilin-talan
In Bengali, rini-jhini
In Chinese, Cantonese, dìuh-díu fihng 吊吊捹 (吊 means "hang")
In Chinese, Mandarin, dīng líng 叮铃, dīng dāng 叮当 
In Batak, giring, giring
In Bulgarian, ljush-bash люш-баш, ding-dong динг-донг
In Croatian, ding dong
In Czech, cinky-cink
In Dutch, tingeling
In English, clink clank, dingle dangle, jingle jangle
In Estonian kill-kõll, kilks-kõlks, kilin-kõlin
In Finnish, kilin, helin
In French, ding-dong
In German, klingeling
In Greek, ντινγκ ντανγκ (ding dang)
In Hebrew,  ding-dong דִינְג־דוֹנְג
In Hungarian, csing-ling, bim-bam, giling-galang
In Japanese,  (chirin chirin),  (chīn)
In Korean, dallang dallang 달랑달랑 ttallang ttallang 딸랑딸랑 jjallang jjallang 짤랑짤랑
In Latvian, dzin dzin
In Macedonian, dang, ding, dong данг, динг, донг
In Malay, ding dong, kring kring
In Polish, dzyń-dzyń
In Romanian, ding-dong
In Russian, din'-don динь-дон dzìnj-dzìnj дзынь-дзынь
In Spanish, ding ding
In Swedish, dingelidång kling klang
In Tagalog, klang klang
In Tamil, sil-sila silu-sila
In Thai,  (kreng),  (krung kring)
In Turkish, çangır çungur, şangır şungur

Music
In Mandarin Chinese, dōng dōng qiāng 咚咚锵

References

Arabic words

Chinese words

Croatian words

Danish words

English words

French words

German words

Greek words

Hebrew words

Italian words

Japanese words

Marathi words

Portuguese words

Spanish words

Ukrainian words

Urdu words

External links
Written Sound, an online onomatopoeia dictionary
Cross-linguistics onomatopoeia at WikIdioms (Archived)
Derek Abbott's, Animal Noises
Portal for the Greek language and language education, onomatopoeic words in Modern Greek
Onomatopoeia - words for rain that sound like rain

Onomatopoeia
Language comparison